Sportsmanship is an aspiration or ethos that a sport or activity will be enjoyed for its own sake. This is with proper consideration for fairness, ethics, respect, and a sense of fellowship with one's competitors. A "sore loser" refers to one who does not take defeat well, whereas a "good sport" means being a "good winner" as well as being a "good loser" (someone who shows courtesy towards another in a sports game).

Analysis 

Sportsmanship can be conceptualized as an enduring and relatively stable characteristic or disposition such that individuals differ in the way they are generally expected to behave in sports situations. Sportsmanship mainly refers to virtues such as fairness, self-control, courage, and persistence, and has been associated with interpersonal concepts of treating others and being treated fairly, maintaining self-control if dealing with others, and respect for both authority and opponents. Sportsmanship is also looked at as being the way one reacts to a sport/game/player.

The four elements of sportsmanship are often shown being good form, the will to win, equity and fairness. All four elements are critical and a balance must be found among all four for true sportsmanship to be illustrated. These elements may also cause conflict, as a person may desire to win more than play in equity and fairness and thus resulting in a clash within the aspects of sportsmanship. This will cause problems as the person believes they are being a good sportsman, but they are defeating the purpose of this idea as they are ignoring two key components of being sportsmanlike. When athletes become too self-centred, the idea of sportsmanship is dismissed.

Today's sporting culture, in particular the base of elite sport, places great importance on the idea of competition and winning and thus sportsmanship takes a back seat as a result. In most, if not all sports, sportsmen at the elite level make the standards on sportsmanship and no matter whether they like it or not, they are seen as leaders and role models in society.

Since every sport is rule driven, the most common offence of bad sportsmanship is the act of cheating or breaking the rules to gain an unfair advantage; this is called unsportsmanlike conduct. A competitor who exhibits poor sportsmanship after losing a game or contest is often called a "sore loser", while a competitor who exhibits poor sportsmanship after winning is typically called a "bad winner". Sore loser behavior includes blaming others for the loss, not accepting responsibility for personal actions that contributed to the defeat, reacting to the loss in an immature or improper fashion, making excuses for the defeat, and citing unfavorable conditions or other petty issues as reasons for the defeat. A bad winner acts in a shallow fashion after his or her victory, such as by gloating about his or her win, rubbing the win in the face(s) of the opponent(s), and lowering the opponent(s)'s self-esteem by constantly reminding the opponent(s) of "poor" performance in comparison (even if the opponent(s) competed well). Not showing respect to the other team is considered to being a bad sportsman and could lead to demoralising effects; as Leslie Howe describes: "If a pitcher in baseball decides to pitch not to his maximum ability suggest that the batter is not at an adequate level, [it] could lead to the batter to have low self-confidence or worth."

There are six categories relating to sportsmanship: the elements of sports, the elements of sportsmanship, clarifications, conflicts, balance and irreducibility. All six of these characterize a person with good sportsmanship. Even though there is some affinity between some of the categories, they are distinct elements. "In essence, play has for its directed and immediate end joy, pleasure, and delights and which is dominated by a spirit of moderation and generosity. Athletics, on the other hand, is essentially a competitive activity, which has for its end victory in the contest and which is characterized of dedication, sacrifice and intensity." (Feelezz, 1896, pp. 3) Hence, the virtues of a player are radically different from the virtues of an athlete. (Feelezz, 1896, pp. 3). When talking about misunderstanding sportsmanship, Rudd and Stoll (2013) provide an example from 1995, a U.S. high school athletic league banned the post-game handshake that was a part of sports such as football and basketball. The handshaking was banned because of fights that were ensuing after the handshake.(pp. 41) Most players are influenced by the leaders around them such as coaches and older players, if there are coaches and administrators who don't understand sportsmanship, then what about the players?

Examples 

There are various ways that sportsmanship is practiced in different sports. Being a good sport often includes treating others as you would also like to be treated, cheer for good plays (even if it is made by the opposition), accept responsibility for your mistakes, and keep your perspective. An example of treating others how you would like to be treated would include being respectful and polite to other team members and the opposition because in return you would also like to be treated the same way. Cheer for good plays could include if in netball a player of the opposition made a good lead for the ball, which then resulted in a goal, everyone would either clap or make a supportive comment to acknowledge that what the player did was very well done. To accept responsibility for your mistakes will entail not placing the blame on other people. 

Some popular examples of good sportsmanship include shaking hands, help an opponent who may have fallen over, encourage everyone, cheer, clap or hi-five, and be respectful to everyone including teammates, the opposition, parents and officials. Most importantly it is often encouraged and said regarding sportsmanship that "It's not whether you win or lose, it's how you play the game."

Sportsmanship can be manifested in different ways depending on the game itself or the culture of the group. For example, in the sport of cricket, a player will sometimes acknowledge that he is out by walking off the field, even though the umpires (game officials) had thought that he was not out. In another example, a tennis player who sees a ball go in but is called out by the linesperson could concede the point or suggest the opponent make a challenge, as was the case with professional tennis player Jack Sock on at least two occasions.

Contributing factors 

Sportsmanship can be affected by a few contributing factors such as the players' values and attitudes towards the sport and also the professional role models that are shown to the public. Role models in sport are expected to act in a moral and respectful way. When elite sporting role models do not encourage sportsmanship this can also encourage people in society to act in similar ways to the athletes that they look up to and idolize. For example, if an individual looked up to an athlete who was drinking excessively, they may see this as acceptable behavior. The direct correlation between sportsmanship and leadership is also considered to be another contributing factor. Having a positive environment in your sporting team will therefore create good sportsmanship from the individuals. Having a positive leadership by the captains, coaches and supporters would then encourage a positive sporting environment.

See also
Lady Byng Memorial, trophy given by the National Hockey League to the player who shows the best sportsmanship
Pierre de Coubertin medal, a special medal handed out during the modern Olympic Games for extraordinary acts of sportsmanship in keeping with the ideals of the Games.
Unsportsmanlike conduct
Gamesmanship
Ultimate (sport)
Football War
 Fair Play Award (disambiguation)
 Fair Play Trophy (disambiguation)

References

External links

AL Notebook, "Torre: Rodriguez Was Wrong to Distract Fielder". The Washington Post, June 2, 2007, Page E06.

 
Sports culture
Etiquette by situation
Interpersonal relationships
Cultural conventions
Psychological attitude

de:Fairness